P'yongyang Choch'ajang is a marshalling yard in Chŏngp'yŏng-dong, P'yŏngch'ŏn-guyŏk, P'yŏngyang, North Korea, on the P'yŏngyanghwajŏn Line of the Korean State Railway, it is the starting point of a branch to the P'yŏngyang Thermal Power Plant.

History
The marshalling yard was opened by the Chosen Government Railway at the same time as Pot'onggang Station on the P'yŏngnam Line, opened on 21 March 1944. The branch from the marshalling yard to the power plant was opened in 1961.

The yard has five tracks, along with a spur track serving the Taedonggang Battery Factory in Saemaŭl-dong, P'yŏngch'ŏn-guyŏk.

References

Railway stations in North Korea
Buildings and structures in Pyongyang
Transport in Pyongyang
Railway stations opened in 1944
1944 establishments in Korea